This is a list of incidents of cannibalism, or anthropophagy, as the consumption of human flesh or internal organs by other human beings. Accounts of human cannibalism date back as far as prehistoric times, and some anthropologists suggest that cannibalism was common in human societies as early as the Paleolithic. Historically, numerous tribal organisations have engaged in cannibalism, although very few are thought to continue the practice to this day.

Occasionally, starving people have resorted to cannibalism for survival necessity. Classical antiquity recorded numerous references to cannibalism during siege starvations. More recent well-documented examples include the Essex sinking in 1820, the Donner Party in 1846 and 1847, and the Uruguayan Air Force Flight 571 in 1972. Some murderers, such as Albert Fish, Boone Helm, Andrei Chikatilo, and Jeffrey Dahmer, are known to have devoured their victims after killing them. Other individuals, such as artist Rick Gibson and journalist William Seabrook, have legally consumed human flesh out of curiosity or to attract attention to themselves.

Prehistoric
 The 100,000-year-old bones of six Neanderthals found in the Moula-Guercy Cave, France, had been broken by other Neanderthals in such a way as to extract marrow and brains. Finds made in the El Sidrón cave in Spain also show evidence of endo-cannibalism.
 Cheddar Man, a human skeleton dating from around 7150 BC, has unusual cuts on his skull. It has been suggested he was a victim of cannibalism.  But it has also been interpreted as a burial ritual.
Genetic studies have revealed a "powerful episode" of natural selection concurrent with the extinction of the Neanderthals. Drawing on hundreds of studies in relation to the kuru disease which is only known to spread through cannibalism, researchers conclude that the 127V gene, which is known only for resisting kuru-like diseases, evidences widespread cannibalism among recent humans. If modern humans and Neanderthals, who co-existed with each other at that time, practised cannibalism together, it is theorised this gene would have protected humans from the kuru-like diseases, but led to the Neanderthals' deaths, perhaps even their extinction.

Middle Ages
Crusaders were reported to have practiced cannibalism during the Siege of Ma'arra.
Tibetan Buddhists would ritualistically consume the flesh of deceased people who were believed to have been born as Brahmins seven times in order to absorb their essence, which they believe could aid in attaining enlightenment.
Waldensians were accused of cannibalism by Inquisition reports.
The Mongols were reported by several European chroniclers such as Matthew Paris to have engaged in cannibalism. Giovanni da Pian del Carpine alleged they would only do so out of necessity, but Simon of Saint-Quentin believed they would also do so for pleasure or to instill fear into their enemies.
For a brief time in Europe, an unusual form of cannibalism occurred when thousands of Egyptian mummies preserved in bitumen were ground up and sold as medicine. The practice developed into a widespread business that flourished until the late 16th century. (As late as the early 19th century, mummies were still believed to have styptic properties against bleeding and were sold as pharmaceuticals in powdered form.).
The Great Famine of 1315–1317 was marked with extreme levels of cannibalism.
Several works by Michel de Montaigne and Jean de Léry, among others, indicated that the Tupinambá tribe practiced cannibalism.
The Akokisa and Atakapa people of modern-day Texas practiced cannibalism.
Island Caribs practiced ritualistic cannibalism.
The Wari' people practiced endocannibalism, specifically mortuary cannibalism.
Numerous incidents of cannibalism were recorded during the drought of 1200–1201 in the Nile River region.
The Aztec practiced cannibalism to some extent, but there is debate about how widespread the practice was and disagreement about if human flesh was a significant part of their diet.
The Korowai people claimed to have continued practicing cannibalism into the present day, as part of an attempt to encourage tourism.
Archeologists found evidence of cannibalism in a Native American tribe in what is now Colorado, dating to 1150.
During the siege of Suiyang up to 30,000 civilians were eaten.

16th–19th centuries

16th century 
In 1503, a group of Qizilbash militants ate the corpses of their enemies after taking over a fort in east Iran.
Álvar Núñez Cabeza de Vaca along with other Spanish conquistadors committed cannibalism in the aftermath of a shipwreck.
On July 21, 1514, the captured Hungarian rebel leader György Dózsa was condemned to sit on a smouldering, heated iron throne, and forced to wear a heated iron crown and scepter (mocking his ambition to be king). While he was suffering, a procession of nine fellow rebels who had been starved beforehand were led to this throne. Next, executioners removed some pliers from a fire and forced them into Dózsa's skin. After tearing his flesh, the remaining rebels were ordered to bite spots where the hot pliers had been inserted and to swallow the flesh. The three or four who refused were simply cut up, prompting the others to comply. In the end, Dózsa died from the ordeal, while the rebels who obeyed were released.
In 1521 two Frenchmen named Pierre Burgot and Michel Verdun were executed for murder and lycanthropy after they admitted having killed and eaten six children while transformed into wolves after making a pact with a witch coven.
In 1563 French settlers from Charlesfort-Santa Elena Site are reported to have resorted to cannibalism while fleeing back to Europe.
The so-called "Werewolf of Dole", Gilles Garnier, was executed in 1572 for strangling four children and eating their flesh.
Peter Stumpp, nicknamed the "Werewolf of Bedburg", was executed in October 1589 after accusations of cannibalism and other crimes.
An unidentified man (his name may have been Nicolas Damont) was burned at the stake in 1598 for the murders of 50 children in the French town of Châlons-en-Champagne after their remains were found in his home, including several partially-eaten cuts of human flesh. He admitted to having abducted, killed and eaten his victims during psychotic episodes but denied accusations by authorities that he had done so while transformed into a werewolf.

17th century
A French youth named Jean Grenier claimed in 1603 that he was a werewolf and had killed and eaten 50 children who had recently gone missing from the town of Saint-Sever. He was convicted of lycanthropy and sentenced to confinement for life due to his young age.
In colonial Jamestown, Virginia, United States, colonists resorted to cannibalism during a period from 1609 to 1610 known as the Starving Time. After food supplies had diminished, some colonists began to dig up corpses for food. During this period, one man was tortured until he confessed to having killed, salted, and eaten his pregnant wife; he was burned alive as punishment.
In 1612, Polish troops stationed in the Moscow Kremlin resorted to cannibalism, in the aftermath of a prolonged siege.
A party of Cossacks under Vassili Poyarkov cannibalized the corpses of Siberian aborigines they had previously killed.
On August 20, 1672, an Orangist mob lynched and ate parts of two prominent anti-monarchist politicians, the Grand Pensionary of Holland (and de facto prime minister of the Netherlands) Johan de Witt and his brother and political ally Cornelis.

18th century
The accounts of the sinking of the Luxborough Galley in 1727 reported cannibalism amongst the survivors during their two weeks on a small boat in the mid-Atlantic.
French showman and soldier Tarrare had reportedly engaged in cannibalism.
Polish soldier Charles Domery ate pieces of a fellow crew member's severed leg.
The July issue of The Gentleman's Magazine contains a sworn account given February 1736, by two sailors, Thomas Thompson (born in Rhode Island) and Simon McCrone (born in Drogheda), crew survivors from a slave carrying ship, Mary, lost at sea en route from Lisbon to Guinea. The account given by the two seamen covers a period from mid-1735 when they first set sail until January 1736 when they were rescued by Glanveil Nicholas, master of a schooner, who picked them up close to and landed them in Bridgetown, Barbados, where they gave their sworn disposition. The men described in some detail (around 800 words) how the ship sprung a leak, the slaves were unchained to help pump, how the ship finally sank, how eight men abandoned ship and some later ate human flesh as a means of surviving before Thompson and McCrone were rescued.
June 1752, Ottawa and Chippewa massacre British trade posts at Fort Pickawillany, boiling and cannibalizing residents and traders.
In 1763, North American Indians performed an act of ritual cannibalism on a British soldier during the Siege of Fort Detroit.

19th century

In an 1809 incident known as the Boyd massacre, about 66 passengers and crew of the Boyd were killed and eaten by Maori on the Whangaroa peninsula, in the north of New Zealand.
Following the French invasion of Russia in 1812, the ill-fated retreat saw some of Napoleon's soldiers resort to cannibalism when facing starvation in the Russian winter.
In 1816, the French frigate Méduse ran aground off Mauritania, and 147 passengers and crew took to sea on a hastily constructed raft. In the chaotic 13 days before they were rescued, the occupants of the raft were driven to suicide, murder, and cannibalism; only 15 men survived the experience, five of whom died soon afterwards.
The Essex was sunk by a sperm whale in the Pacific Ocean, in 1820. Most survivors of Captain Pollard's ship spent 90 days in small whaling boats before being rescued. Seven of the members who died during the 90 days were documented to have been eaten, some after they died, two others who were sacrificed for that purpose after drawing lots. One of the small boats was found containing two survivors sucking on the marrow of a human bone. The tale of the Essex inspired Herman Melville to write his novel, Moby-Dick (1851).
In 1822, Alexander Pearce, an Irish convict, led an escape from Macquarie Harbour Penal Settlement in Van Diemen's Land. Pearce was captured near Hobart and confessed that he and the other escapees had successively killed and cannibalised members of their group over a period of weeks, he being the last survivor.
A French woman named Aimée Debully was raped and murdered by Antoine Léger in 1824. Léger then ate Debully's heart and performed acts of necrophilia on the body.
The May 27, 1826 issue of The Acadian Recorder reported that the surviving crew of the ship Francis Mary resorted to cannibalism.
The Portuguese schooner Arrogante was captured in late November 1837 by HMS Snake, off the coast of Cuba. At the time, the Arrogante had more than 330 Africans on board, who had been shipped from the Upper Guinea coast. Once the vessel arrived in Montego Bay, Jamaica, the British authorities apprenticed those who had survived. Shortly after landing, however, the Arrogante’s sailors were accused of slaughtering an African man, cooking his flesh, and forcing the rest of those enslaved on board to eat it. Furthermore, they were also accused of cooking and eating themselves the heart and liver of the same man.
John Williams of the London Missionary Society and a colleague were killed and eaten at Dillon Bay, Erromango island, Vanuatu, in 1839.
An ex-voto painting at the Sanctuary of Our Lady of Tal-Ħerba in Birkirkara, Malta which is dated 29 March 1840 depicts the crew of a ship being massacred in an unknown location in West Africa by pygmies who appear to be cannibals. The latter are depicted as drinking the blood of three beheaded crew members, while five other people are still alive and waiting a similar fate. It is unclear if the crew were from a British ship or a Maltese brigantine. The painting was commissioned or possibly painted by Michele Cachia, who might have been the sole survivor, and he attributed his survival to divine intervention.
Liver-Eating Johnson reportedly ate the livers of Crow warriors he had previously slain.
In the United States, the group of settlers known as the Donner Party resorted to cannibalism while snowbound in the Sierra Nevada mountains, for the winter of 1846–1847.
The last survivors of Captain Sir John Franklin's lost arctic expedition of 1845 were found to have resorted to cannibalism in their final push across King William Island, Canada, towards the Back River.
Clergyman Sabine Baring-Gould, in his 1865 book The Book of Were-Wolves, Being an Account of a Terrible Superstition, recorded an 1849 case in which a vagrant named Swiatek was arrested in the Galician village of Połomia for murdering a 14-year-old girl and eating parts of her body. Swiatek also admitted to having killed and eaten five other people since 1846, although evidence was found of up to 14 victims. He claimed that he had developed a taste for human flesh three years previously after hunger obliged him to eat the body of a man killed in a tavern fire.
Boone Helm, also known as "The Kentucky Cannibal", was an American mountain man, serial killer, and fugitive, who ate human flesh on several occasions between 1850 and 1854, often out of necessity in extreme conditions. He made no secret of the fact and is reported to have said: "Many's the poor devil I've killed, at one time or another ... and the time has been that I've been obliged to feed on some of 'em".
In the United States, 10 survivors found nearly two months after the Utter Party Massacre of 1860 had eaten five deceased party members.
In November 1874, three British sailors survived by committing cannibalism acts in the aftermath of the Cospatrick disaster.
Alferd Packer was an American prospector who was accused of cannibalism during the winter of 1873–1874. First tried for murder, Packer was eventually sentenced to 40 years in prison after being convicted of manslaughter.
The Flatters expedition of 1880–81 was a doomed attempt to explore the route of a proposed Trans-Saharan railway from Algeria to the Sudan. Almost all members of the expedition were massacred by hostile Tuaregs at Bir el-Garama in February 1881. 37 of the expedition's 93 men were killed and over 200 camels seized by the Tuaregs, but 56 survivors, including 4 Frenchmen, began a 1,500 kilometres (930 mi) retreat by foot to Ouargla with little food or water. Continuously stalked by the Tuaregs, the survivors resorted to cannibalism on the long retreat through the desert. Only seven of the original 93 men survived.
The case of R v. After several days, one of the crew, a 17-year-old cabin boy, fell unconscious due to a combination of starvation and drinking seawater. The others (one possibly objecting) decided then to kill him and eat him. They were picked up four days later. Two of the three survivors were found guilty of murder. A significant outcome of this case was that necessity was determined to be no defence against a charge of murder.
In June 1888, members of the Emin Pasha Relief Expedition allegedly paid Tippu Tip to procure a young girl who was then killed and eaten in front of them. The event was recounted to Henry Morton Stanley by interpreter Assad Farran, resulting in a moratorium being placed on scientific expeditions into Africa.
A report dated to July 28, 1892, indicates that three people were convicted on charges of cannibalism in the Sahalin penal colony. Two songs referencing cannibalism were also recorded among the residents of the colony.
During October 1888, during the investigation of the Whitechapel murders, George Lusk received a letter alongside half a preserved human kidney. The letter's writer claimed to be serial killer Jack the Ripper, and claimed to have fried and eaten the other half of the kidney.

20th century

1900s
The Protestant missionaries James Chalmers and Oliver Fellows Tomkins were murdered and cannibalized on Goaribari Island, Papua New Guinea on April 8, 1901.
During the course of the Bailundo Revolt, a group of Ovimbundu rebels decapitated a native merchant named Antonio de Silveira, roasted, and then consumed his body. The rebels forced Silveira's wife to carry his head in a basket. The killing held a ritualistic purpose aiming to produce "success magic", as the perpetrators belonged to the Kandundu Cult.
On March 27, 1902, the body of 11-year-old Sosuke Kawai was found in Tokyo, Japan, with his eyeballs gouged out and pieces of flesh from his buttocks missing. His supposed murderer, Otokosaburo Noguchi, who was arrested three years later for an unrelated murder, claimed that he had boiled the boy's muscle tissues and served them in chicken soup to his ill brother-in-law, ostensibly to cure his leprosy.

1910s
The crew members of the steamship, Dumaru, spent three weeks adrift in a lifeboat, after the ship exploded and sank in the western Pacific Ocean on October 16, 1918. Quickly exhausting their supply of food and water, they resorted to cannibalism to survive.

1920s

During the Russian famine of 1921–1922, there were many reports of cannibalism. In his book The Gulag Archipelago, Soviet writer Aleksandr Solzhenitsyn described cases of cannibalism in 20th-century Soviet Union. Of the famine in Povolzhie (1921–1922) he wrote: "That horrible famine was up to cannibalism, up to consuming children by their own parents – the famine, which Russia had never known even in Time of Troubles [in 1601–1603]".
Serial killer Albert Fish caused much debate over whether or not he was insane, because he consumed his victims. He confessed to molesting more than 400 children over 20 years and is believed to have murdered somewhere between 6 and 15 children. Psychiatrist Fredric Wertham described Fish as looking like "a meek and innocuous little old man, gentle and benevolent, friendly and polite. If you wanted someone to entrust your child to, he would be the one you would choose". Fish's most infamous murder is that of Grace Budd in 1928, whose flesh he cut into strips, and cooked with carrots, onions, and strips of bacon. This excited him sexually. Wertham described how Fish's account of the culinary process was "like a housewife describing her favorite methods of cooking. You had to remind yourself that this was a little girl he was talking about". When the same psychiatrist declared Fish mad, Fish disagreed and stated he was just "queer".
On December 20, 1924, German authorities uncovered pieces of human flesh along with a list of 40 people Karl Denke had previously killed and cannibalized.
December 19, 1926, fisherman Eli Kelly washed up on Catalina Island after being lost at sea for 11 days. He had partially subsisted on the flesh of his fishing companion James McKinley who died naturally (of dehydration or starvation) during the ordeal.

1930s
Before 1931, The New York Times reporter William Buehler Seabrook, allegedly in the interests of research, obtained from a hospital intern at the Sorbonne a chunk of human meat from the body of a healthy human killed in an accident, then cooked and ate it. He reported,
 "It was like good, developed veal, not young, but not yet beef. It was very definitely like that, and it was not like any other meat I had ever tasted. It was so nearly like good, fully developed veal that I think no person with a palate of ordinary, normal sensitiveness could distinguish it from veal. It was mild, good meat with no other sharply defined or highly characteristic taste such as for instance, goat, high game, and pork have. The steak was slightly tougher than prime veal, a little stringy, but not too tough or stringy to be agreeably edible. The roast, from which I cut and ate a central slice, was tender, and in color, texture, smell as well as taste, strengthened my certainty that of all the meats we habitually know, veal is the one meat to which this meat is accurately comparable".
Cannibalism was widespread during the Holodomor (famine of Ukraine) in 1932 and 1933; multiple acts of cannibalism were reported from Ukraine, Russia's Volga, South Siberian, and Kuban regions during the Soviet famine of 1932–1933.
 "Survival was a moral as well as a physical struggle. A woman doctor wrote to a friend in June 1933 that she had not yet become a cannibal, but was "not sure that I shall not be one by the time my letter reaches you". The good people died first. Those who refused to steal or to prostitute themselves died. Those who gave food to others died. Those who refused to eat corpses died. Those who refused to kill their fellow man died. ... At least 2,505 people were sentenced for cannibalism in the years 1932 and 1933 in Ukraine, though the actual number of cases was certainly much higher".
On December 9, 1934, grave robber and suspected serial killer Alonzo Robinson was arrested for the axe-slaying of the Turner couple in their Cleveland, Mississippi home. Among other items, salted and cured portions of human flesh belonging to Mrs. Turner, completed with bite marks, were found in his pockets.
An Italian woman named Leonarda Cianciulli killed three women in 1939 and 1940, turning their bodies into teacakes which she fed to others as well as consumed herself.

1940s
Members of the Leopard Society centered in Sierra Leone, Liberia and Côte d'Ivoire, indulged in cannibalism.
There are eyewitness accounts of cannibalism during the Siege of Leningrad (1941–1944), including reports of people cutting off and eating their own flesh.
Following the German surrender at the Battle of Stalingrad in January and February 1943, roughly 100,000 German soldiers were taken prisoner of war (POW). Almost all of them were sent to POW camps in Siberia or Central Asia where, due to being chronically underfed by their Soviet captors, many resorted to cannibalism. Fewer than 5,000 of the prisoners taken at Stalingrad survived captivity. The majority, however, died early in their imprisonment due to exposure or sickness brought on by conditions in the surrounded army before the surrender.
 In November 1942, Finnish soldiers discovered the remains of a Soviet partisan, butchered and eaten by his comrades in Seesjärvi. There are also accounts of cannibalism in Karelia during the 1920s Heimosodat wars.
 Cannibalism took place in the concentration and death camps in the Independent State of Croatia (NDH), a Nazi German puppet state which was governed by the fascist Ustasha organization, who committed the Genocide of Serbs and the Holocaust in NDH. Some survivors testified that some of the Ustashas drank the blood from the slashed throats of the victims.
The Australian War Crimes Section of the Tokyo Tribunal, led by prosecutor William Webb (the future Judge-in-Chief), collected numerous written reports and testimonies that documented Japanese soldiers' acts of cannibalism among their own troops, on enemy dead, and on Allied prisoners of war in many parts of the Greater East Asia Co-Prosperity Sphere. In September 1942, Japanese daily rations on New Guinea consisted of 800 grams of rice and tinned meat. However, by December, this had fallen to 50 grams. According to historian Yuki Tanaka, "cannibalism was often a systematic activity conducted by whole squads and under the command of officers".

In some cases, flesh was cut from living people. An Indian POW, Lance Naik Hatam Ali (later a citizen of Pakistan), testified that in New Guinea: "the Japanese started selecting prisoners and every day one prisoner was taken out and killed and eaten by the soldiers. I personally saw this happen and about 100 prisoners were eaten at this place by the Japanese. At this place, the Japanese again started selecting prisoners to eat. Those selected were taken to a hut where their flesh was cut from their bodies while they were alive and they were thrown into a ditch where they later died."
Another well-documented case occurred in Chichijima in February 1945, when Japanese soldiers killed and consumed five American airmen. This case was investigated in 1947 in a war crimes trial, and of 30 Japanese soldiers prosecuted, five (Maj. Matoba, Gen. Tachibana, Adm. Mori, Capt. Yoshii, and Dr Teraki) were found guilty and hanged (Admiral Mori was initially sentenced to life in prison, but he was hanged after being convicted in a separate war crimes trial by the Dutch East Indies).

1950s–1960s
A tradition of ritualistic cannibalism among the Fore people caused a Kuru epidemic, involving approximately 1000 deaths from 1957 to 1960.
German serial killer Joachim Kroll, nicknamed "Duisburg Man-Eater", practised cannibalism.
In October 1961, Indigenous Papuans supposedly killed and ate Michael Rockefeller while he was exploring southern Netherlands New Guinea.
In summer of 1963, Josef Kulík from Czechoslovakia (at that time serving compulsory military service) killed two young boys in a railway wagon. He cut their bodies open, roasted some of their internal organs on a fire, and ate them. He used some old funeral wreaths he had found near the wagon for fuel.
Factional violence and cannibalism occurred in the Guangxi Zhuang Autonomous Region of southeast China in 1968, during the Cultural Revolution (1966–1976).

1970s
On July 13, 1970, police arrested Stanley Baker on charges of killing and cannibalizing a Montana, U.S. resident.
In 1972, Uruguayan Air Force Flight 571 crashed on a glacier in Argentina at  altitude. They had only eight chocolate bars, a tin of mussels, three small jars of jam, a tin of almonds, a few dates, candies, dried plums, and several bottles of wine which they made last a week. Eight days after the crash on October 13, 1972, they learned that the search had been terminated. The remaining survivors, including the rugby team from Stella Maris College in Montevideo and some of their family members and other passengers, mutually agreed to cannibalism. They were rescued after 72 days on December 22, 1972. The story of the survivors was chronicled in Piers Paul Read's 1974 memoir, Alive: The Story of the Andes Survivors (1974), in a film adaptation of the book, titled simply Alive (1993), and in the documentary: Stranded: I Have Come from a Plane That Crashed in the Mountains (2008).
Also in 1972, at the same time as the Andean incident, Marten Hartwell crashed his aircraft near the arctic circle in Canada's Northwest Territories. The three passengers died in the month it took searchers to find them, but Hartwell survived by eating part of one body.
Between 1970 and 1973, Lester Harrison raped and murdered between four and six women in Chicago's Grant Park area. After his arrest, he confessed that he had cut off a piece of flesh from one of the victims' bodies, which he brought back to his home and ate.
In 1977 and 1978, the "Vampire of Sacramento" Richard Chase ate parts of his victims and drank their blood to treat his imaginary illnesses.
On August 20, 1979, Albert Fentress lured, killed and cannibalized an 18-year-old high school student.
From 1979 to 1980, Nikolai Dzhumagaliev killed at least seven women and cannibalized their corpses.

1980s
On June 11, 1981, Issei Sagawa murdered a Dutch woman, named Renée Hartevelt, by shooting her in the neck with a rifle at his home in Paris. After having sex with the corpse, he began to eat her, starting with the buttocks and thighs. A few days later, he was discovered while attempting to dump the mutilated body into a lake and was subsequently arrested. He was held for two years without trial, then declared legally insane. Soon afterward, Japanese author Inuhiko Yomota published Sagawa's memoirs, including a detailed account of the murder. The book was a bestseller, and Sagawa became a minor celebrity. However, he was quickly extradited to Japan, where mental health professionals announced that he was perfectly sane. Because the French government refused to grant access to secret court documents, the Japanese authorities were unable to bring charges against him. He was released in 1986, and moved to Tokyo where he made a living as a freelance writer.
Ladislav Hojer, a serial killer from Czechoslovakia, confessed to killing a young woman in 1981. He cut off her breasts and vagina and tried to eat the latter with mustard, after boiling it in salty water. He later admitted he had thrown part of it away because of its underwhelming taste.
Michael Woodmansee was convicted in 1983 of kidnapping and killing 5-year-old Jason Foreman in 1975 in South Kingstown, Rhode Island. There was evidence at the time that Woodmansee wrote in his journal of eating Foreman's flesh.
In 1986, American Hadden Clark killed and cannibalized 6-year-old Michelle Dorr.
In November 1986, American Gary M. Heidnik abducted six women. After one of the women died, he fed the other victims a combination of dog food and human flesh.
In 1988, artist Rick Gibson tried to eat a slice of human testicle in Vancouver in 1989, but was stopped by the police. However, the charge was dropped and he finally ate a testicle hors d'œuvre in Vancouver, in 1989.
On 19 August 1989, New York City resident Daniel Rakowitz stabbed Monika Beerle to death in their apartment. He then boiled and ate her brains before distributing food containing her body parts to the homeless.

1990s
Jeffrey Dahmer, a serial killer living in Milwaukee, Wisconsin, United States, murdered 17 young men and boys between 1978 and 1991. Following his arrest, he told police that he had cut up the thighs, biceps, and internal organs of three of his victims and cooked them in a stovetop skillet before consuming them. He claimed they tasted like filet mignon.
In November 1991, newlywed Omaima Aree Nelson murdered, dismembered, and cannibalized her husband, William E. "Bill" Nelson, in their Costa Mesa, California home. Pathology reports indicate Bill was still alive when Omaima began butchering his body, in which court and media reports indicate was a ritualistic manner. She then boiled and cooked his head in the oven, ate its flesh, and stored the foil-wrapped skull in the freezer; skinned his torso; deep fried his hands in oil; and cooked and dipped his ribs in barbecue sauce and tasted them.
Andrei Chikatilo, a serial killer born in Ukraine, experienced killing and cannibalism as paraphilia. He was convicted for murder in 1992 and subsequently executed.
The Chijon family was a South Korean gang that engaged in cannibalism.
On February 21, 1995, 21-year-old Brazilian farmer Marinaldo de Alcântara Silva, killed his own mother, 54-year-old Raimunda Soares Alcântara Silva with a knife and ate some parts of her face, before being shot dead by a soldier in Castanhal II, Belém, Brazil. Earlier, he wanted to kill a watchman from the Secretaria Estadual de Agricultura's building, Domingos Souza, but was prevented by his mother. Moments before, he wanted to set his family's hut on fire. Silva's mother wanted to calm him down but was received with a knife blow to the face and had her head decapitated by Silva, who then torn off the eyes, lips, nose and tongue of the victim and ate the pieces. José Lima Soares, Silva's brother-in-law, called the police. Silva resisted arrest, and was shot in the thigh, dying of hemorrhage. Before being shot, he injured the soldier Miguel Gurjão.
Child molester Nathaniel Bar-Jonah was suspected of abducting, murdering and cannibalising 10-year-old Zach Ramsay in February 1996. Bar-Jonah, who had sexual fantasies about eating human flesh, possessed a journal written in code which, when decoded, was found to contain a number of recipes for cooking and eating children and neighbors recalled that he often hosted barbecues where he served "funny-tasting meat" that he claimed to have personally hunted despite never going hunting. He also had not made any grocery purchases in the month after Ramsay's disappearance and human hair and body tissue that was not his was found in his meat grinder.
Ilshat Kuzikov, of St. Petersburg, Russia, was convicted in March 1997 of eating three male acquaintances since 1992.
 In March 1999, in Indonesia, some Madurese people were eaten by Dayaks as part of an ethnic conflict.
A court submission at the trial of perpetrators of the Snowtown murders, in South Australia, revealed that two of the murderers fried and ate a part of their final victim in 1999.
Dorángel Vargas, also known as "el comegente" (Spanish for "people-eater"), was a Venezuelan serial killer and cannibal who killed and ate at least 10 men in a period of two years preceding his arrest in 1999.
On August 13, 1999, Kazakhstani authorities arrested three male psychiatric nurses on charges of killing and eating seven prostitutes.

21st century

2000s
In February 2000, Katherine Knight killed her partner John Price and cooked his corpse, later preparing to serve it to his children.
In 2000, the Chinese performance artist Zhu Yu claimed to have prepared, cooked, and eaten human fetuses as an artistic performance. He was prosecuted for his actions by the Chinese government.
In February–March 2001 in Indonesia, as part of the Sampit conflict, a number of Madurese had their body parts, including their hearts, eaten by Dayaks.
In March 2001 in Germany, Armin Meiwes posted an Internet ad seeking a young man willing to be slaughtered and eaten. The ad was answered by Bernd Jürgen Brandes. Meiwes stabbed Brandes in the neck with a kitchen knife, kissing him first, then chopped him up into several pieces. He placed several pieces of Brandes in the freezer. Over the next few weeks, Meiwes defrosted and cooked parts of Brandes in olive oil and garlic and eventually consumed 20 kg of human flesh. Meiwes was convicted of manslaughter in 2004. A retrial in 2006 found Meiwes guilty of murder, and sentenced him to life imprisonment. Three songs, "Mein Teil" by Rammstein, "Eaten" by Bloodbath, and "Armin Meiwes" by SKYND are based on this case.
In April 2001 in Kansas City, Kansas, United States, Marc Sappington went on a murder spree and was subsequently convicted of murdering four acquaintances. He gained notoriety for eating part of the leg of one of his victims, Alton "Fred" Brown.
In July 2002, four Ukrainians were arrested in Kyiv for killing and eating a teenage girl. They were suspected of killing at least 6 people. Evidence showed that the murders may have been influenced by satanism.
In a 2003 drug-related case, the rap artist Big Lurch was convicted of the murder and partial consumption of an acquaintance while both were under the influence of PCP.
In 2003 and 2004, a South Korean serial killer Yoo Young-chul murdered a total of 21 people, eating the livers of several of his victims.
In February 2004, 39-year-old Peter Bryan from East London, England was caught after he killed his friend Brian Cherry and ate parts of his brain, fried in butter. He had been arrested for murder previously, but was released shortly before this act was committed. While on trial for the murder of Cherry, Bryan was sentenced to life imprisonment, despite his claim of diminished responsibility. In January 2006, his sentence was revised to a minimum of 15 years.
25 albino Tanzanians have been murdered since March 2007 reportedly through witch doctor butchery arising from prevailing superstition. In 2008, Tanzania's President Jakaya Kikwete publicly condemned witch doctors for killing people with albinism for their body parts, which are thought to bring good luck.
In 2006 and 2007, Indian serial killer Surinder Koli killed and cannibalized 19 people, the majority of which were children. His employer, Moninder Singh Pandher, was initially also convicted of the murders, but the conviction was later overturned.
On January 5, 2007, French authorities reported that a prison inmate committed cannibalism on a cellmate, in the city of Rouen.
On January 13, 2007, Marco Evaristti hosted a dinner party where the main course was agnolotti pasta that was topped with a meatball made from his own fat, removed earlier in the year in a liposuction operation.
On September 14, 2007, a man named Özgür Dengiz was captured in Ankara, the Turkish capital, after killing and eating a man. After cutting slices of flesh from his victim's body, Dengiz distributed the rest to stray dogs on the street, according to his own testimony. He ate some of the man's flesh raw on his way home. Dengiz, who lived with his parents, arrived at the family house and placed the remaining parts of the body in the refrigerator without saying a word to his parents.
On October 8, 2007, Mexican police arrested José Luis Calva Zepeda for murder. Numerous pieces of cooked human flesh were discovered in his house.
In January 2008, notorious Liberian ex-rebel and reformed warlord Joshua Blahyi, 37, confessed to participating in human sacrifices which "included the killing of an innocent child and plucking out the heart, which was divided into pieces for us to eat." The cannibalism of many children occurred during the conflict in which Blahyi fought against Liberian president Charles Taylor's militia. On March 13, 2008, during the same war crimes trial, Joseph Marzah, Taylor's chief of operations and head of Taylor's alleged "death squad", accused Taylor of ordering his soldiers to commit acts of cannibalism against enemies, including peacekeepers and United Nations personnel.
In May 2008, British model Anthony Morley was arrested after murdering his lover Damian Oldfield and eating part of his leg.
The murder of Tim McLean occurred on the evening of July 30, 2008. McLean, a 22-year-old Canadian man, was stabbed, beheaded and cannibalized while riding a Greyhound Canada bus near Portage la Prairie, Manitoba. According to witnesses, McLean was sleeping with his headphones on when the man sitting next to him, Vincent Li, pulled a large knife out of his backpack and began stabbing McLean in the neck and chest. The attacker then decapitated McLean, severed other body parts, and consumed some of McLean's flesh.
In a documentary by Colombian journalist Hollman Morris, a demobilized paramilitary confessed that during the mass killings that took place in Colombia's rural areas, many of the paras performed cannibalism. He also confessed that they were told to drink the blood of their victims in the belief that it would make them want to kill more.
In November 2008, a group of 33 undocumented immigrants from the Dominican Republic, who were en route to Puerto Rico, resorted to cannibalism after they were lost at sea for over 15 days before being rescued by a U.S. Coast Guard patrol boat.
In February 2009, it was reported that five members of the Kulina tribe in Brazil were wanted by Brazilian authorities on the charge of murdering, butchering, and eating a farmer in a ritual act of cannibalism.
In April 2009, two men from the city of Perm, Russia, killed and ate their brother.
On April 28, 2009, Angelo Mendoza Sr attacked his 4-year-old son, eating the boy's left eye and damaging the boy's right eye. Angelo Mendoza Jr. told authorities "my daddy ate my eyes," when they came to the scene. Mendoza was charged with was mayhem, torture, child cruelty, and inflicting an injury to a child, and was later found not guilty by reason of insanity.
On July 26, 2009, a San Antonio, Texas woman, Otty Sanchez, was found in a hysterical state by police, having killed her own 3-week-old son and cannibalized parts of the infant's corpse. 
On November 14, 2009, three homeless men in Perm, Russia were arrested for killing and eating the parts of a 25-year-old male victim. The remaining body parts were then sold to a local pie and kebab house.
Between 2009 and 2011, a Berlinskoe, Russia resident and serial killer Alexander Bychkov engaged in numerous acts of cannibalism, targeting people he had previously lured into his house.

2010s 
In April and May 2010, PhD student Stephen Griffiths from Bradford, England killed and ate three prostitutes, becoming known as the Crossbow Cannibal.
In April 2011, in the town of Darya Khan, Punjab, Pakistan, brothers Arif Ali and Farman Ali were arrested for eating a human corpse stolen from a grave. They were cooking body parts for a meal when arrested; the police also recovered remains of human body parts from their house. The brothers were released from jail in 2013; however, in April 2014, they were once again discovered to be making curry out of a human corpse (this time, the body of a two- to three-year-old child), presumed to have been stolen from a graveyard.
On July 9, 2011, a model in the St. Petersburg region of Russia drowned her colleague and consumed parts of her corpse. She was later detained, found guilty of murder, and sent to a psychiatric hospital for treatment, where she was diagnosed with schizophrenia.
In August 2011, police found the body parts of various victims in serial killer Matej Čurko's refrigerator, including those of two Slovak women who disappeared in 2010.
In 2011, officials in South Korea received a tip that ethnic Koreans living in China were smuggling drug capsules into the country containing powder made from dead babies, passing them off as stamina boosters. The ethnic Korean citizens of China tried to smuggle them into South Korea and consume the capsules or distribute them to other ethnic Korean citizens of China living in South Korea. Reportedly, the capsules were made in northeastern China from dead fetuses whose bodies were chopped into small pieces and dried on stoves before being turned into powder.
Dennis Storm and Valerio Zeno, the two presenters of the Dutch TV show, Proefkonijnen, appeared to eat each other's flesh on air in December 2011. They were filmed having a piece of their muscle tissue surgically removed, which was then fried and eaten in front of a studio audience. The stunt was later revealed as a hoax.
In December 2011, a man killed and ate a homeless man in the city of Bridgeport, Connecticut, United States. The perpetrator of the crime was later found insane and committed to a maximum-security psychiatric hospital.
On March 21, 2012, a Vladivostok man killed his friend, later selling his meat in a local market. Another man was convicted of willingly consuming the flesh of the victim.
On April 13, 2012, a Japanese man, artist Mao Sugiyama, cut off, cooked, and served his genitals to five people. Each of the diners paid $250 per portion.
In April 2012, a man and two women were arrested in the town of Garanhuns, Pernambuco, Brazil for murdering at least two women and eating their flesh. One of the female suspects is said to have used some of the flesh of her victims for making pastries, which she allegedly sold in the town.
In April 2012, Jieming Liu, 79, was accused of killing his wife and eating some of her flesh in Shrewsbury, Massachusetts. The couple had immigrated from China in November 2011.
On May 26, 2012, police in Miami, Florida, United States, shot and killed Rudy Eugene, 31, after he was found on the MacArthur Causeway naked and eating the face of a homeless man, Ronald Poppo, 65 who survived the attack. Police believed that Eugene was under the influence of a synthetic drug, but the autopsy of Eugene showed only marijuana in his system. A security camera at the headquarters of the Miami Herald caught the attack live on film, which quickly began making rounds on the internet. Poppo has had facial surgery since the attack and was still having treatment a year after the attack.
In July 2012, 29 members of a cannibal cult were arrested in northeast Papua New Guinea after eating at least seven people (four men and three women) believed to be sorcerers.
In October 2012, Japanese authorities convicted three men for killing and eating a common friend in 2009.
On December 26, 2012, Mridul Kumar Bhattacharya and his wife Rita Bhattacharya who owned tea gardens in Assam, India were murdered by an angry mob of workers. Cannibalism was later reported in the incident.
On January 10, 2013, the Chinese cannibal Zhang Yongming, aged 57, was executed for his crimes. He sold victims’ flesh as ‘ostrich meat’ and kept eyeballs in wine.
On March 17, 2013, a 47-year-old man mutilated, sexually assaulted, and ate pieces of a 77-year-old woman, in North Bay, Ontario, Canada. He reportedly suffered from severe depression and the court found his attack was perpetrated during a psychotic incident, rendering him not criminally responsible.
In May 2013, during the Syrian civil war, a rebel named Abu Sakkar was filmed cutting open the body of a fallen enemy soldier and biting into one of his organs; it is unclear what he bit into.
In July 2013, the Italian cannibal Lino Renzi, aged 45, was discovered by the police whilst he was cooking some remains of his mother, Maria Pia Guariglia, aged 73, in his apartment. The police had been called by a neighbour after smelling a disgusting odor coming from Renzi's apartment, possibly caused by some intestine chunks burning on the grill. Several pieces of human body were also discovered in a freezer, oven and pots, while most of the corpse, lying in the bathroom, featured severe mutilation to arms and legs, with several intestine pieces removed. Later on, Renzi confessed that his mother had not died of natural causes, but she had been brutally beaten to death by him after a quarrel, then dismembered into pieces with a saw and a butcher knife.
On January 13, 2014, the BBC reported that a Christian man nicknamed "Mad Dog" ate his Muslim rival's foot, during the CAR conflict.
On September 15, 2014, a man from Jeffersonville, Indiana, United States, killed and ate parts of his girlfriend.
On October 31, 2014, a crowd stoned to death, burned, and then ate a suspected Allied Democratic Forces insurgent in the town of Beni, North Kivu in the Democratic Republic of the Congo. The incident came after a number of ADF raids, that brought the October's civilian death toll to over 100 people.
On November 6, 2014, Matthew Williams, 34, was allegedly found eating his 22-year-old victim's face in a room of the Sirhowy Arms Hotel in the village of Argoed, near Blackwood, South Wales, United Kingdom.
On 6 January 2015, a Reuters report revealed that the Mexican La Familia Michoacana and Knights Templar cartels were forcing potential recruits to eat the hearts of their victims as part of an initiation rite.
 In November 2015, police in Bandar Lampung arrested 30-year-old Rudi Efendi and his wife Nuriah on suspicion of having murdered and castrated a man Nuriah accused of raping her before cooking and eating his penis.
 On 10 July 2016, an American man, along with 10 of his friends, legally ate tacos made out of his own foot. The leg had been amputated 3 weeks earlier, after his foot failed to heal following a motorcycle accident 2 year prior. The man asked his friends: "Remember how we always talked about how, if we ever had the chance to ethically eat human meat, would you do it?", and that led to the friends sharing meat cut from his amputated foot. Details of this incident were posted to Reddit in 2018.
 On 16 August 2016, 19-year-old Florida State University student Austin Harrouff fatally stabbed a couple, Michelle Mishcon and John Stevens, in their garage and began eating Stevens' face before being subdued by deputies.
 In 2017, a ring of cannibals was arrested by the police and tried in South Africa.
 In a CNN documentary series titled Believers, journalist Reza Aslan consumed a portion of a human brain presented to him by the Aghori Hindu sect.
 Journalist Jesús Lemus Barajas claimed in an interview in 2017 that he had witnessed Los Zetas cartel kingpin Heriberto Lazcano Lazcano eating flesh from the buttocks of enemies he had sentenced to death. According to Barajas, before they died the victims were forced to bathe for two hours and given whiskey in order to reduce adrenaline levels and allow the meat to de-stress. They would then be killed as quickly as possible and their buttocks would be served to Lazcano in tamales or on toast.
 In August 2017, a man living in Kolhapur killed his mother and ate her heart with chutney and pepper.
 In September 2017, Dmitry Baksheev, 35, and Natalia Baksheeva, 42, were arrested in Krasnodar, Russia on suspicion of committing more than 30 cannibalistic murders.
 Russian serial killer Eduard Seleznev was arrested in March 2018, and was soon found to have killed three people before liquefying their bodies and consuming them.
On 30 October 2018, a father and son were detained in Saltivka, Kharkiv, Ukraine after being accused of beheading an ex-police officer, aged 45, and consuming his body.
In February 2019, Alberto Sánchez Gómez was arrested in Madrid, Spain when he self confessed to killing his 66-year-old mother, cutting her body into 1,000 pieces, and sharing the meat with his dog to eat.
In December 2019, the mutilated body of Kevin Bacon, a 25-year-old hairstylist from Swartz Creek, Michigan, was found hanging from the ceiling in the home of a man he met on the gay dating app Grindr. The alleged murderer, who has mental health issues, said he cut off and ate Bacon's testicles.

2020s 
In October 2022, a couple (Bhagaval Singh and Laila), along with an accomplice (Muhammad Shafi), were arrested in Kerala, India for performing esoteric human sacrifice. During interrogation it was revealed that they killed two women and later cooked and ate the body parts of the victims in hopes of health and prosperity.

See also
Autocannibalism
Cannibalism
List of autocannibalism incidents

References

Incidents of cannibalism